Sony Magazine is a quarterly magazine published by Haymarket Network on behalf of Sony Corporation UK, with articles on film, music, games, television, sound, vision, gadgets, and adventure. It was founded in 2007 by Tim Southwell, the former co-founder of Loaded.

References

External links

Sony
Magazines established in 2008
Quarterly magazines published in the United Kingdom
Science and technology magazines published in the United Kingdom